Operation Kamala, Operation Lotus or sometimes Operation Black Lotus is a term coined in 2008, when India's former minister G. Janardhana Reddy in the State of Karnataka, used all possible tricks (persuade, bribe, punishment, divide) to secure support from legislators bypassing the anti-defection law, so as to take the Bharatiya Janata Party (BJP) past the majority number. Operation Lotus refers to "poaching" or "bribing" of MLAs and MPs of other parties by the BJP, mainly of their rivals the Indian National Congress party (INC), often to from government in states where they do not have the majority.

This practice has been seen subsequently in many states such as  Arunachal Pradesh, Madhya Pradesh, Rajasthan, Uttarakhand, Goa, Manipur, Karnataka, Maharashtra.

Timeline

MLAs involved in BJP's Operation Kamala 

According to Arvind Kejriwal, the BJP has so far bought 277 MLAs by spending about  crore to form governments in many states.

Arunachal Pradesh

In 2014 Arunachal Pradesh Legislative Assembly election, BJP won 11 out of 60 seats, while INC won 42 seats. During the political crisis in 2015-16, the INC MLAs rebelled against the incumbent Chief Minister Nabam Tuki. Tuki was replaced by Pema Khandu as the Chief Minister. After that, 43 MLAs from INC defected to PPA and later 33 of PPA members joined the BJP, including Pema Khandu, while only Nabam Tuki remained with INC.

Bihar
It failed in Bihar in August 2022.

Delhi 

Delhi Chief Minister Arvind Kejriwal alleged that "BJP has spent Rs 6,500 crore rupees on buying 277 MLAs, they also tried to buy Aam Aadmi Party’s (AAP) MLAs in Delhi, and they offered 20 crores to each. They brought Rs 800 crores to buy MLAs of Delhi."  Kejriwal conducted a floor test in the Delhi Assembly to prove that his government continued to have the majority in the assembly and BJP's alleged Operation Lotus in Delhi had failed to poach AAP MLAs. CM successfully proved his majority in the legislature.

Goa

2019

2022 
On 14 September 2022, 8 Congress MLAs switched to BJP. Former Chief Minister of Goa Digambar Kamat and Michael Lobo, along with other 6 Congress MLAs joined Bharatiya Janata Party, after meeting Dr. Pramod Sawant, Chief Minister of Goa from BJP.

Jharkhand
It failed in Jharkhand in August 2022 after chief minister Hemant Soren successfully proved his majority in the legislature.

Karnataka

2008
The BJP won 110 seats in the assembly elections in May 2008, falling three seats short of a simple majority. With the backing of six independents, Yeddyurappa took the oath of office as chief minister to establish the first BJP administration in south India. But to further secure the stability of the administration, the BJP lured seven MLAs—three from the Congress and four from the JD(S) in an operation purportedly funded by mining tycoon and former BJP minister Janardhan Reddy of Bellary—by offering them money and power. The BJP scored five victories in the by-elections, bringing its total in the 224-member assembly to 115. Operation Kamala eventually became the name of the entire exercise.

The MLAs who switched parties during the Operation Kamala and resigned are J. Narasimha Swamy, Anand Asnotikar, Jaggesh, Balachandra Jarkiholi, K. Shivanagouda Naik. Umesh Katti and D. C. Gourishankar.

2019 

Ramesh Jarkiholi organized 14 other Congress MLAs to resign their posts. Ramesh Jarkiholi was one of the 15 MLAs from Congress and 2 from JD(S) who resigned in July 2019, bringing down the HDK Congress-JD(S) coalition and allowing B.S. Yeddyurappa (BSY) to return to power. After Supreme Court ruling held up their disqualification but allowed them to run, Jarkiholi joined BJP along with all other rebels inducted by Yeddyurappa and other important persons.

Investigations
On 31 March 2021, the bench of Justice D'Cunha refused to quash the FIR against the sitting Chief Minister of Karnataka B. S. Yediyurappa in a case nicknamed Operation Kamala case. At the time of the alleged incident, Yediyurappa was the leader of opposition.

Reactions
 In an interview with Deccan Herald in March 2019, B. S. Yediyurappa said "Operation Kamala was not wrong and I don't regret it. It is part of democracy."
Lehar Singh Siroya claimed that the BJP cadre in the State was “by and large against the Operation Kamala” as that would not help the party in the long term.
H. D. Kumaraswamy alleged that the BJP used Operation Kamala to affect the defections of MLAs from his government, causing it to fall.

Madhya Pradesh

The crisis started when long loyalist Congress politician Jyotiraditya Scindia suddenly went to Delhi and resigned from Congress and joined BJP. This led to many supporters of him resigning from Congress as well.
Hardeep Singh Dang resigned from the assembly membership and consequently from Indian National Congress, citing in a letter, 'ignorance from his party' and then joined BJP on March 21, 2020, along with 21 others. Ultimately, this exodus led to the fall of the Kamal Nath government.

Maharashtra 

Maharashtra political crisis 2022 refers to the fall of Maha Vikas Aghadi (MVA) government in Maharashtra after rebel MLAs withdrew the support. The rebel MLAs first moved to Surat, Gujarat, a BJP-ruled state, where they were hosted by BJP's C. R. Patil, and later flown to another BJP-ruled state, Assam, where they were welcomed by BJP MLA Sushanta Borgohain and chief minister Himanta Biswa Sarma, who was waiting for them in a five-star hotel, and the MLAs were also given heavy police security. After the resignation of Uddhav Thackeray, the MVA government fell and Eknath Shinde became chief minister and BJP's Devendra Fadnavis became Deputy CM.

Punjab 

Aam Aadmi Party, the ruling party in Punjab, accused BJP of spending ₹1375 Crore in Punjab to bribe the AAP MLAs. Punjab's Finance Minister Harpal Singh Cheema said in a press conference, "Our MLAs have been approached with offers of up to Rs 25 crore to break away from AAP. The MLAs were told: “bade bau ji se milwayenge”. These MLAs have also been offered big posts. They were told that if you get more MLAs along, you would be given up to Rs 75 crore,"

See also
 Government of India
 State governments of India
 Law of India
 Indian political scandals
 Disqualification of convicted representatives in India
 Political families of India
 2019 Karnataka Political Crisis
 Political corruption

References

Further reading

External links
 Outline of the Indian Government

Politics of India
Political controversies in India
Corruption in India
Bharatiya Janata Party